William Magee was a Drummer in the United States Army and a Medal of Honor recipient for his role in the American Civil War.
Magee was the youngest person from the state of New Jersey to have ever earned the Medal of Honor.

At the time of Magee's enlistment in the United States Army, he was about the age of only 14 years. He left behind his family in Newark to fight and serve in the American Civil War as a drummer.

Medal of Honor citation
Rank and organization: Drummer, Company C, 33d New Jersey Infantry. Place and date: At Murfreesboro, Tenn., December 5, 1864. Entered service at:------. Birth: Newark, N.J. Date of issue: February 7, 1866.

Citation:

In a charge, was among the first to reach a battery of the enemy and, with one or two others, mounted the artillery horses and took two guns into the Union lines.

See also
 List of Medal of Honor recipients
 List of American Civil War Medal of Honor recipients: M–P

Notes

References

This article includes text in the public domain from the U.S. Government.
 

United States Army Medal of Honor recipients
Military personnel from Newark, New Jersey
Year of birth unknown
Year of death unknown
American Civil War recipients of the Medal of Honor